Dragonquest is a science fantasy novel by the American-Irish author Anne McCaffrey. It is the sequel to Dragonflight, set seven years later and the second book in the Dragonriders of Pern series. Dragonquest was first published by Ballantine Books in May 1971.

Origins
According to her son Todd, McCaffrey's agent Virginia Kidd and editor Betty Ballantine provided crucial advice and assistance in her struggle with the sequel to Dragonflight. After the agent first read a draft, the author followed her advice to "burn it", and she met with the editor in long sessions. It was near completion before she emigrated to Ireland in September 1970, with her two younger children Todd and Georgeanne, one month after divorcing her husband. She finished it soon after the move.

Plot summary
As it opens, tensions are rising between the Oldtimers, those dragonriders who came forward in time 400 turns (Pernese years) to help the undermanned contemporary dragonriders protect the planet Pern and its inhabitants from the destructive Thread. F'nor (rider of Canth, a Brown dragon that rivals the size of the Bronze dragons) attempts to mediate, but things escalate to the point that an Oldtimer, T'reb (who is disturbed by his green dragon being in heat), stabs F'nor. F'nor is sent to the Southern Continent to recover, where he falls in love with Brekke and discovers the wicked deeds of Weyrwoman Kylara. F'lar, F'nor's half-brother, is eventually forced into a duel with T'ron, the leader of the Oldtimers, which ends in banishment for the Oldtimers who will not accept F'lar's leadership and in a grave injury for F'lar. Brekke's queen dragon (Wirenth) rises in mating flight but is attacked by Kylara's queen dragon (Prideth), and both dragons die, leaving their riders in near-catatonic states. Only Brekke recovers, mostly because she can hear other dragons (besides her own queen, Wirenth).

With the Lords Holder adamant that the dragonriders attempt to eliminate Thread at its source, F'nor attempts to direct himself and his dragon, Canth, to the Red Star, but they find the atmosphere inhospitable, and they fall back to Pern, badly injured.  Brekke's cry for F'nor not to leave her was also the inspiration for a song by Menolly, after she found that a certain guitar chord sounded amazingly like Brekke's voice when she screamed. This is chronicled in Dragonsinger.

Awards
Dragonquest was one of six nominees for the 1972 Hugo Award for Best Novel (voted by participants in the annual World Science Fiction Convention) and it placed fifth for the 1972 Locus Award for Best Novel (voted by Locus magazine readers).

The American Library Association in 1999 cited the two early Pern trilogies (Dragonriders and Harper Hall), along with The Ship Who Sang, when McCaffrey received the annual Margaret A. Edwards Award for her "lifetime contribution in writing for teens".

See also
 The Atlas of Pern (1984), a companion book produced by Karen Wynn Fonstad in consultation with McCaffrey.

Notes

References

Sources

External links
 
 

1971 novels
Dragonriders of Pern books
Novels by Anne McCaffrey
1971 fantasy novels
1971 science fiction novels
Ballantine Books books